Defeated may refer to:

"Defeated" (Breaking Benjamin song)
"Defeated" (Anastacia song)
"Defeated", a song by Snoop Dogg from the album Bible of Love
Defeated, Tennessee, an unincorporated community
The Defeated a 2021 Netflix series about postwar Berlin

See also
Defeat (disambiguation)
Defeated Creek (disambiguation)